Time in Lithuania is given by Eastern European Time (EET; UTC+02:00). Daylight saving time, which moves one hour ahead to UTC+03:00 is observed from the last Sunday in March to the last Sunday in October. Latvia adopted EET in 1920.

History 
Lithuania observed DST between 1941 and 1944, and since 1981 (with a brief break between 2000 and 2002).

IANA time zone database 
In the IANA time zone database, Lithuania is given one zone in the file zone.tab – Europe/Vilnius. Data for Lithuania directly from zone.tab of the IANA time zone database; columns marked with * are the columns from zone.tab itself:

See also 
Time in Europe
List of time zones by country
List of time zones by UTC offset

References

External links 
Current time in Lithuania at Time.is